The Finance Federation is a trade union representing workers in the financial sector in Denmark.

The union was founded at the start of 1992, when the National Association of Danish Bank Employees merged with the Association of Danish Savings Bank Employees.  The new union had a membership of about 50,000 workers and, like its predecessors, it affiliated to the Danish Trade Union Confederation (FTF), becoming its largest affiliate.

By 2018, the union had 39,011 members.  Workers at large institutions are organised by employer, while those at smaller companies are organised on a geographical basis.

The FTF became part of the Danish Trade Union Confederation in 2019, but the Finance Federation voted against joining the new organisation, and so became unaffiliated with any national body.

References

External links

Finance sector trade unions
Trade unions established in 1992
Trade unions in Denmark